James Frederic Heuga (September 22, 1943 – February 8, 2010) was an American alpine ski racer who became one of the first two members of the U.S. men's team to win an Olympic medal in his sport.  After multiple sclerosis prematurely ended his athletic career, he became an advocate of exercise and activity to combat the disease.

Born in San Francisco, California, Heuga grew up in Squaw Valley, California, where his father Pascal (1909–2011), a Basque immigrant from southwestern France, opened a grocery store in 1945 in Lake Forest and later operated the resort's cable car (1968–1988).

Heuga was on skis at age two and began to compete in the sport at age five; he appeared in a Warren Miller ski film at age nine. Heuga was named to the U.S. Ski Team in 1958, becoming the youngest man ever to make the squad as a fifteen-year-old.

He went to the University of Colorado in Boulder, where he was coached by Bob Beattie. A three-time letterman, Heuga won the NCAA championship in the slalom in 1963. With Beattie also leading the U.S. Ski Team, Heuga, along with fellow Buffaloes Buddy Werner and Bill Marolt (and future CU alumnus Billy Kidd), formed the squad's nucleus for the 1964 Winter Olympics. Both Kidd and Heuga became the first American men to win Olympic medals in Alpine skiing, respectively capturing silver and bronze in the slalom.
 finished sixth in the slalom and fourth in the combined at the 1966 World Championships at Portillo, Chile
 joined the pro racing tour following the 1968 Winter Olympics where he was 7th in the slalom and 10th in the giant slalom.
 was diagnosed with multiple sclerosis in 1970, which derailed his ski racing career at age 27.
 founded Can Do Multiple Sclerosis, formerly The Heuga Center for Multiple Sclerosis.
 the first NASTAR National Pacesetter (1968)

Heuga died on February 8, 2010, at Boulder Community Hospital in Boulder, due to complications from multiple sclerosis, exactly 46 years after he won his Olympic medal. The gold medalist in that slalom race, Pepi Stiegler, was also diagnosed with MS in 1993, as was Egon Zimmerman, the gold medalist in the downhill.

World Championship results 

From 1948 through 1980, the Winter Olympics were also the World Championships for alpine skiing.
At the World Championships from 1954 through 1980, the combined was a "paper race" using the results of the three events (DH, GS, SL).

Olympic results

References

External links

 
 
 mscando.org – Can Do Multiple Sclerosis
 University of Colorado Athletics – Hall of Fame – Jimmie Heuga
 
 Sports Humanitarian Hall of Fame – Jimmie Heuga
 Sports Illustrated – cover – February 5, 1968 – Olympics preview – Billy Kidd & Jimmie Heuga
 Sports Illustrated – February 17, 1964 article
 "Skiing History" Jimmie Heuga obituary with eulogy by Billy Kidd
 "Skiing Heritage" Biography of Jimmie Heuga by Seth Masia

1943 births
2010 deaths
American male alpine skiers
Alpine skiers at the 1964 Winter Olympics
Alpine skiers at the 1968 Winter Olympics
American people of Basque descent
Neurological disease deaths in Colorado
Deaths from multiple sclerosis
Olympic bronze medalists for the United States in alpine skiing
University of Colorado alumni
Sportspeople from San Francisco
Medalists at the 1964 Winter Olympics
Colorado Buffaloes athletes
People from Olympic Valley, California
20th-century American people